Hager is an unincorporated community in Klamath County, Oregon, United States. It is between Klamath Falls and Olene along Oregon Route 39 and Oregon Route 140.

Hager had a station on the Oregon, California and Eastern Railway, which by 1927 reached from Klamath Falls to Bly. A 1941 timetable lists Hager as the second stop east of Klamath Falls between it and Pine Grove. After 1990, the rail line passing through Hager became part of a rail trail, the OC&E Woods Line State Trail, managed by the Oregon Parks and Recreation Department.

References

Unincorporated communities in Klamath County, Oregon
Unincorporated communities in Oregon